You Have to Run Fast is a 1961 American crime film directed by Edward L. Cahn and starring Craig Hill, Elaine Edwards, and Grant Richards.

Plot
After trying to save a mortally wounded detective's life, Dr. Condon flees for his own life because of gangster Jim Craven's intention to eliminate him, an eyewitness to the crime. Condon moves to another town and changes his name. He finds lodging in the remote home of the wheelchair-using Colonel Maitland and daughter Laurie.

Craven comes to town, is recognized by a deputy and shoots him. Condon must reveal his true identity as a doctor to operate on the law officer. He is at Craven's mercy, but Colonel Maitland's deadeye aim with a rifle saves his life.

Cast
 Craig Hill as Dr. Condon / Frank Harlow
 Elaine Edwards (actress) as Laurie
 Grant Richards as Big Jim Craven
 Willis Bouchey as Col. Maitland
 Claudia Barrett as Fran

References

External links
 
 
 
 

1961 films
1960s English-language films
American black-and-white films
1960s crime thriller films
American crime thriller films
Films directed by Edward L. Cahn
Films produced by Edward Small
Films scored by Richard LaSalle
United Artists films
1960s American films